The women's discus throw event at the 2007 Pan American Games was held on July 23.

Results

References
Official results

Discus
2007
2007 in women's athletics